Eucalyptus croajingolensis, commonly known as the East Gippsland peppermint or Gippsland peppermint, is a species of tree that is endemic to southeastern Australia. It has rough, short-fibrous bark on the trunk and larger branches, sometimes smooth bark on the thinner branches, lance-shaped to curved adult leaves, flower buds in groups of nine or more, white flowers and hemispherical to cup-shaped fruit.

Description
It has rough, grey or brownish short-fibrous bark on the trunk and branches, sometimes smooth white or grey bark on the thinner branches. Flowering occurs from December to February and the flowers are white.

Taxonomy and naming
Eucalyptus croajingolensis was first formally described in 1990 by Lawrie Johnson and Ken Hill from a specimen collected near Orbost. The description was published in the journal Telopea. The specific epithet (croajingolensis) is a reference to the district and county Croajingolong where this eucalypt is found. The ending -ensis a Latin suffix "denoting place, locality [or] country".

Distribution and habitat
The east Gippsland peppermint grows in forest, often on alluvial soils and occurs from near Eden in New South Wales south to Bairnsdale in Victoria, mostly east of south of the Great Dividing Range.

References

croajingolensis
Myrtales of Australia
Flora of New South Wales
Trees of Australia
Plants described in 1990
Taxa named by Lawrence Alexander Sidney Johnson
Taxa named by Ken Hill (botanist)